Desvenlafaxine, sold under the brand name Pristiq among others, is a medication used to treat depression. It is an antidepressant of the serotonin-norepinephrine reuptake inhibitor (SNRI) class and is taken by mouth. It is recommended that the need for further treatment be occasionally reassessed. It may be less effective than its parent compound venlafaxine, although some studies have found comparable efficacy.

Common side effects include dizziness, trouble sleeping, increased sweating, constipation, sleepiness, anxiety, and sexual problems. Serious side effects may include suicide in those under the age of 25, serotonin syndrome, bleeding, mania, and high blood pressure. A withdrawal syndrome may occur if the dose is decreased or the medication completely stopped. It is unclear if use during pregnancy or breastfeeding is safe.

Desvenlafaxine was approved for medical use in the United States in 2008. In Europe its application for use was denied in 2009. But it is available in Spain and Germany. In 2020, it was the 176th most commonly prescribed medication in the United States, with more than 3million prescriptions.

Medical uses
Desvenlafaxine is primarily used as a treatment for major depressive disorder. Use has only been studied up to 8 weeks. It may be less effective than venlafaxine, although some studies have found comparable efficacy with a lower rate of nausea.

Doses of 50–400 mg/day appear effective for major depressive disorder, although no additional benefit was demonstrated at doses greater than 50 mg/day, and adverse events and discontinuations were more frequent at higher doses.

Desvenlafaxine improves the HAM-D17 score and measures of well-being such as the Sheehan Disability Scale (SDS) and 5-item World Health Organization Well-Being Index (WHO-5).

Adverse effects
Frequency of adverse effects:

Very common adverse effects include:

Nausea
Headache
Dizziness
Dry mouth
Hyperhidrosis
Diarrhea
Insomnia
Constipation
Fatigue

Common adverse effects include:

Tremor
Blurred vision
Mydriasis
Decreased appetite
Sexual dysfunction
Insomnia
Anxiety
Elevated cholesterol and triglycerides
Proteinuria
Vertigo
Feeling jittery
Asthenia
Nervousness
Hot flush
Irritability
Abnormal dreams
Urinary hesitation
Yawning
Rash

Uncommon adverse effects include:

Hypersensitivity
Syncope
Depersonalization
Hypomania
Withdrawal syndrome
Urinary retention
Epistaxis (nose bleed)
Alopecia (hair loss)
Orthostatic hypotension
Peripheral coldness

Rare adverse effects include:

Hyponatraemia (low blood sodium)
Seizures
Extrapyramidal side effects
Hallucinations
Angioedema
Photosensitivity reaction
Stevens–Johnson syndrome

Common adverse effects whose intensity is unknown include:

Abnormal bleeding (gastrointestinal bleeds)
Narrow-angle glaucoma
Mania
Interstitial lung disease
Eosinophilic pneumonia
Hypertension
Suicidal behavior and thoughts
Serotonin syndrome

Pharmacology
Desvenlafaxine is a synthetic form of the isolated major active metabolite of venlafaxine, and is categorized as a serotonin-norepinephrine reuptake inhibitor (SNRI). When most normal metabolizers take venlafaxine, approximately 70% of the dose is metabolized into desvenlafaxine, so the effects of the two drugs are expected to be very similar. It works by blocking the "reuptake" transporters for key neurotransmitters affecting mood, thereby leaving more active neurotransmitters in the synapse. The neurotransmitters affected are serotonin (5-hydroxytryptamine) and norepinephrine (noradrenaline). It is approximately 10 times more potent at inhibiting serotonin uptake than norepinephrine uptake.

Approval status

United States

Wyeth announced on 23 January 2007 that it received an approvable letter from the Food and Drug Administration for desvenlafaxine. Final approval to sell the drug was contingent on a number of things, including:
A satisfactory FDA inspection of Wyeth's Guayama, Puerto Rico facility, where the drug is to be manufactured;
Several postmarketing surveillance commitments, and follow-up studies on low-dose use, relapse, and use in children;
Clarity by Wyeth around the company's product education plan for physicians and patients;
Approval of desvenlafaxine's proprietary name, Pristiq.

The FDA approved the drug for antidepressant use in February 2008, and was to be available in US pharmacies in May 2008.

In March 2017, the generic form of the drug was made available in the US.

Canada
On February 4, 2009, Health Canada approved use of desvenlafaxine for treatment of depression.

European Union
In 2009, an application to market desvenlafaxine for major depressive disorder in the European Union was declined. In 2012, Pfizer received authorization in Spain to market desvenlafaxine for the disorder. In August 2022, following a 14-year approval process, desvenlafaxine was brought to the market for the disorder in Germany.

Australia
Desvenlafaxine is classified as a schedule 4 (prescription only) drug in Australia. It was listed on the PBS (Pharmaceutical Benefits Scheme) in 2008 for the treatment of major depressive disorders.

See also 
 Venlafaxine
 Ansofaxine

References

External links 
 

Serotonin–norepinephrine–dopamine reuptake inhibitors
Cyclohexanols
Dimethylamino compounds
Phenethylamines
Phenols
Wyeth brands
Pfizer brands
Tertiary alcohols
Human drug metabolites
Wikipedia medicine articles ready to translate
Antidepressants